The western lowland olingo (Bassaricyon medius) is a species of olingo from Central and South America, where it is known from Panama and from Colombia and  Ecuador west of the Andes.

Description
The western lowland olingo is smaller than the northern olingo, but larger than the most montane member of the genus, the recently described olinguito ("little olingo"). While the Panamanian subspecies B. m. orinomus is about the same size as the eastern lowland olingo, the subspecies from west of the Andes, B. m. medius is smaller. The pelage is slightly lighter than that of the eastern species.

It weighs .

Taxonomy
There are two subspecies of the western lowland olingo: the nominate B. m. medius (Colombia and Ecuador) and B. m. orinomus (Panama and possibly Colombia). The closest relative of the western lowland olingo is the other lowland olingo species, B. alleni, found east of the Andes, from which it diverged about 1.3 million years ago.

References

Procyonidae
Carnivorans of South America
Mammals of Colombia
Mammals of Ecuador
Carnivorans of Central America
Mammals described in 1909
Least concern biota of South America
Taxa named by Oldfield Thomas